Fonda Rae Wood (performing as simply Fonda Rae) is an American R&B singer best known for her club hits like "Over Like a Fat Rat" and "Touch Me" (the latter which was later covered by Cathy Dennis). She has also worked with artists such as Don Armando, Kid Creole and the Coconuts, Taka Boom, The Fat Boys and Debbie Harry.

Discography

Singles

Legacy
"Over Like a Fat Rat" was sampled by the following artists:
Grand Puba's "Fat Rat" was based on the song. It appeared on the 1991 movie Strictly Business.
Eric B. & Rakim and Marley Marl, sampled the song into "Eric B. Is President"
SWV sampled the song on the single "On & On" on their album New Beginning.
Master P uses the Eric B. sample of "Fat Rat" on the title track of his 1997 gangsta rap album Ghetto D.
Kool G Rap sampled the song in "Lifestyles of the Rich and Famous".
De La Soul sampled the song on the single " Keepin' The Faith" from the De La Soul Is Dead album.
Two Shiny Heads Bass line was sampled on single "Dub House Disco Part 2" on Guerrilla Records in 1992?

References

External links
 – official site

Digital Jukebox Records – record label

Living people
Year of birth missing (living people)
People from Ossining, New York
21st-century African-American women singers
American contemporary R&B singers
American disco singers
American dance musicians
Singers from New York (state)